Visa requirements for Thai citizens are administrative entry restrictions imposed on citizens of Thailand by the authorities of other states. As of January 2022, Thai citizens had visa-free or visa on arrival access to 79 countries and territories, ranking the Thai passport 72nd in terms of travel freedom according to the Henley Passport Index. Thailand is also a part of ASEAN and has visa-free access to these countries and vice versa.

Visa requirements map

Visa requirements

Territories and disputed areas
Visa requirements for Thai citizens for visits to various territories, disputed areas, partially recognized countries and restricted zones:

APEC Business Travel Card

Holders of an APEC Business Travel Card (ABTC)  travelling on business do not require a visa to the following countries:

1 – up to 90 days
2 – up to 60 days
3 – up to 59 days

The card must be used in conjunction with a passport and has the following advantages:
undertake legitimate business in participating economies
expedited border crossing in all member economies, including transitional members
expedited scheduling of visa interview (United States)

Non-visa restrictions

See also

 Visa policy of Thailand
 Thai passport
 Foreign relations of Thailand

References and notes
References

Notes

 Visa policy of Thailand
 Thai passport

Thailand
Foreign relations of Thailand